Ivan Konstantinovich Pravov (4 November 1899 – 11 May 1971) was a Russian and Soviet film director and screenwriter.

Filmography
director
 Women of Ryazan (Бабы рязанские) (1927); co-directed with Olga Preobrazhenskaya
 A Town Full of Light (Светлый город) (1928); co-directed with Olga Preobrazhenskaya
 The Last Attraction (Последний аттракцион) (1929); co-directed with Olga Preobrazhenskaya
 And Quiet Flows the Don (Тихий Дон) (1930); co-directed with Olga Preobrazhenskaya
 Paths of Enemies (Вражьи тропы) (1935); co-directed with Olga Preobrazhenskaya
 Stepan Razin (Степан Разин) (1939); co-directed with Olga Preobrazhenskaya
 Lad from Taiga (Парень из тайги) (1941); co-directed with Olga Preobrazhenskaya
 Diamonds (Алмазы) (1947)
 Under Gold's Power (Во власти золота) (1957)
 One Line (Одна строка) (1960)
 Chain Reaction (Цепная реакция) (1962)
 Treasures of the Republic (Сокровища республики) (1964)
 The Gift (Подарок) (1966); short

screenwriter
 Anne (Аня) (1927)
 A Town Full of Light (Светлый город) (1928)
 And Quiet Flows the Don (Тихий Дон) (1930)
 Paths of Enemies (Вражьи тропы) (1935)
 Stepan Razin (Степан Разин) (1939)
 Under Gold's Power (Во власти золота) (1957)

External links

Soviet film directors
Soviet screenwriters
Male screenwriters
1899 births
1971 deaths
20th-century screenwriters